Harpalus nyassicus is a species of ground beetle in the subfamily Harpalinae. It was described by Basilewsky in 1946.

References

nyassicus
Beetles described in 1946